Government Polytechnic, Amravati is an autonomous institute of government of Maharashtra which is one of the oldest & finest institute established in 1955 located in Amravati  city of Vidarbha.The institute is approved by All India Council for Technical Education, New Delhi & Government of Maharashtra has awarded an academic autonomy to the institute since 1995.
It offers various courses like Civil Engineering, Mechanical Engineering, Electrical Engineering, Computer Engineering, Information Technology, Electronics & Telecommunication Engineering, Plastic and Polymer Engineering and Chemical Engineering.

Education in Amravati